The 27th Arizona State Legislature, consisting of the Arizona State Senate and the Arizona House of Representatives, was constituted in Phoenix from January 1, 1965, to December 31, 1966, during Samuel Pearson Goddard Jr.'s only term as Governor of Arizona. The number of senators remained constant at two per county, totaling 28, and the members of the house of representatives also held steady at 80. The Democrats picked up two seats in the Senate, giving them a 26–2 edge in the upper house, while the Republicans gained three seats in the House, trimming the Democrats majority to 45–35.

Sessions
The Legislature met for two regular sessions at the State Capitol in Phoenix. The first opened on January 11, 1965, and adjourned on April 20; while the second convened on January 10, 1966, and adjourned on April 23. There were four Special Sessions, all in 1965.  The first Special Session convened April 21, 1965, and adjourned sine die on May 10; the second convened on May 11, 1965, and adjourned sine die on June 15; the Third Special session convened on June 16, 1965, and adjourned sine die on July 1; with the final Special Session, the fourth, convened September 13, 1965 and adjourned sine die on October 9.

State Senate

Members

The asterisk (*) denotes members of the previous Legislature who continued in office as members of this Legislature.

House of Representatives

Members 
The asterisk (*) denotes members of the previous Legislature who continued in office as members of this Legislature.

References

Arizona legislative sessions
1965 in Arizona
1966 in Arizona
1965 U.S. legislative sessions
1966 U.S. legislative sessions